Jubilee: Juneteenth Edition is the fifth live album by American contemporary worship music collective Maverick City Music, which was released via Tribl Records on June 18, 2021.

The album is a dual-side feature consisting of a live produced gospel A-Side titled Breathe and a rap/R&B/pop produced B-Side titled Same Blood. Side A contains guest appearances by Lecrae, Dante Bowe, Todd Dulaney, Jekalyn Carr, Mav City Gospel Choir, Chandler Moore, Jonathan McReynolds, Doe, Maryanne J. George, Naomi Raine, Israel Houghton, Ryan Ofei, Bri Babineaux, and Katie Torwalt. Side B contains guest appearances by Lecrae, Joe L Barnes, Koryn Hawthorne, Harolddd, Tamar Braxton, Eugene Kiing, Ciara, Rapsody, Naomi Raine, Dante Bowe, Montell Fish, and Chandler Moore.

The album was supported by the release of "Breathe" as a single. "Breathe" peaked at number 31 on the US Hot Christian Songs chart and at number ten the Hot Gospel Songs chart.

Jubilee: Juneteenth Edition became a commercially successful album upon its release, debuting at number eight on Billboard's Top Christian Albums Chart and at number two Top Gospel Albums Chart in the United States, as well as number ten on the Official Charts' Official Christian & Gospel Albums Chart in the United Kingdom. Jubilee: Juneteenth Edition was nominated for the Grammy Award for Best Gospel Album at the 2022 Grammy Awards. It was also nominated for the Billboard Music Award for Top Gospel Album at the 2022 Billboard Music Awards. At the 2022 GMA Dove Awards, Jubilee: Juneteenth Edition was nominated for the GMA Dove Award for Contemporary Gospel Album of the Year, while "Breathe" won the GMA Dove Award for Gospel Worship Recorded Song of the Year.

Background
On June 2, 2021, Maverick City Music announced that they were preparing for the release of their following project, Jubilee: Juneteenth Edition. The album follows their commercially collaborative album with Elevation Worship, Old Church Basement (2021). Jubilee: Juneteenth Edition was released on June 18, 2021, in celebration of Juneteenth, which became an official federal holiday in the United States.

The creative process of the album began with Jubilee (2021), which had been written during the 2020 Black Lives Matter protests. Naomi Raine expressed that from there, they had an intention of releasing a Juneteenth Edition, saying "We were actually getting to speak from a more sober place. Not in the middle of a lot of tragedy."

Music and lyrics
The album is a dual-side feature consisting of a live produced gospel A-Side titled Breathe and a rap/R&B/pop produced B-Side titled Same Blood.

Release and promotion
Maverick City Music released "Breathe" on June 4, 2021, as the lead single from the album, exclusively on Apple Music. Apple Music selected the song as part of its specially curated playlist of songs to honor Juneteenth 2021 titled Juneteenth 2021: Freedom Songs. "Breathe" won the GMA Dove Award for Gospel Worship Recorded Song of the Year at the 2022 GMA Dove Awards.

Reception

Critical response

Reviewing for Louder Than The Music, Jono Davies gave a positive review of the album, saying: "The beauty of music is that it can speak to us no matter how we are feeling, some albums can speak to us if we are in the best place or not such a great place, some albums can encourage us to worship, some encourage us to jump up and down, some encourage us to step out to change the world, some deal with injustice, some albums change us, some albums change our soul and our heart and I don't think I'm wrong in saying this, but this album does all of that. The album really takes you on a journey, emotionally and musically."

Accolades

Commercial performance
In the United States, Jubilee: Juneteenth Edition earned 3,000 equivalent album units in its first week of sales, and as a result debuted at number eight on the Top Christian Albums Chart and at number two the Top Gospel Albums Chart dated June 24, 2021.

Track listing
All the tracks on Side A: Breathe were produced by Aaron Moses, Brandon Lake, Chandler Moore, Jonathan Jay, and Tony Brown.

All tracks on Side B: Same Blood were produced by Harold Brown and Jeff Schneeweis, except where stated.

Charts

Weekly charts

Year-end charts

Release history

References

2021 live albums
Maverick City Music albums